Koumankou is a village and rural commune in the Cercle of Sikasso in the Sikasso Region of southern Mali. The commune covers an area of 243 square kilometers and includes 4 villages. In the 2009 census it had a population of 4,227. The village of Koumankou, the chef-lieu of the commune, is 101 km northwest of Sikasso.

References

External links
.

Communes of Sikasso Region